Steve Court (born July 21, 1950) is an American politician who served as a member of the Arizona House of Representatives, representing District 18. He was the majority leader of the Arizona House of Representatives. First elected in 2008, he retired after the expiration of his second term in January 2013.

Early life and education
Court was born and raised in Massachusetts. He graduated from the University of Massachusetts Lowell with a Bachelor of Science degree in accounting.

Career 
In 1974, Court moved to Arizona, where he spent the next twenty years working in the Accounting and Financial Analysis department for the telecommunications company Motorola. After working in Motorola, he opened a small business in 1996, and sold it ten years later to one of his sons.

Political career

2008 election
Court was first elected to the Arizona House of Representatives in 2008. Along with fellow Republican Cecil Ash, Court defeated Democrat Tammie Pursley and Independent Joe Brown.

2009–2010
In the 2009–2010 legislative session, Court served on these committees:
 Appropriations Committee
 Education Committee
 Health and Human Services Committee
He was the vice chairman of the Health and Human Services Committee.

2010 election
Court was reelected, along with fellow incumbent Cecil Ash, during the 2010 elections. They faced no opposition during the Republican primary, and defeated Democrat Michael Conway and Libertarian Chris A. H. Will during the general election.

2011–2012
In the 2011–2012 legislative session, Court served on the following committees:

 Appropriations Committee, Arizona House of Representatives, Vice Chair
 Education Committee, Arizona House of Representatives
 Higher Education, Innovation and Reform Committee, Arizona House of Representatives, Chair

Court did not seek another term during the 2012 general election and will retire when his current term ends.

Personal life 
Court is married to Susan, the couple has four children.

References 

1950 births
Living people
University of Massachusetts Lowell alumni
Republican Party members of the Arizona House of Representatives